Matar Dieye (born 10 January 1998) is a Senegalese footballer who plays as a forward for Debreceni VSC.

Club career
He started his career in Italian fourth-tier Serie D with Sacilese.

He made his Serie B debut for Vicenza on 23 April 2016 in a game against Spezia, as an 86th-minute substitute for Filip Raičević.

After playing for two years for the Croatian team HNK Gorica, during which he scored 7 goals in 55 league appearances, the club and Dieye officially parted ways on August 1st 2022.

References

External links
 
 

1998 births
Living people
Senegalese footballers
Association football forwards
A.S.D. Sacilese Calcio players
L.R. Vicenza players
Torino F.C. players
Tarxien Rainbows F.C. players
FC Olimpik Donetsk players
FC Karpaty Lviv players
HNK Gorica players
Debreceni VSC players
Serie D players
Serie B players
Maltese Premier League players
Ukrainian Premier League players
Nemzeti Bajnokság I players
Senegalese expatriate footballers
Expatriate footballers in Italy
Expatriate footballers in Malta
Expatriate footballers in Ukraine
Expatriate footballers in Croatia
Expatriate footballers in Hungary
Senegalese expatriate sportspeople in Italy
Senegalese expatriate sportspeople in Malta
Senegalese expatriate sportspeople in Ukraine
Senegalese expatriate sportspeople in Croatia
Senegalese expatriate sportspeople in Hungary